First-seeded Helen Jacobs defeated second-seeded Sarah Palfrey 6–1, 6–4 in the final to win the women's singles tennis title at the 1934 U.S. National Championships.

Seeds
The tournament used two lists of four players for seeding the women's singles event; one for U.S. players and one for foreign players. Helen Jacobs is the champion; others show in brackets the round in which they were eliminated.

  Helen Jacobs (champion)
  Sarah Palfrey (finalist)
  Carolin Babcock (semifinals)
  Dorothy Andrus (semifinals)
  Betty Nuthall (second round)
  Kay Stammers (quarterfinals)
  ?
  Freda James (quarterfinals)

Draw

Final eight

References

1934
1934 in women's tennis
1934 in American women's sports
Women's Singles